Carmen is a musical with a book by Norman Allen, lyrics by regular collaborator Jack Murphy, and music by Frank Wildhorn. It is based on the novella of the same name.

It premiered in Prague in October 2008 at the Karlín Musical Theater.

Plot
Carmen, inspired by the Mérimée classic, contains the essence but explores the iconic story in a new way, this time against the backdrop of an extravagant circus.

Original Czech production - song list

Act I
Prolog (Sevillana)
Cesty osudu / Winds of Fate
Svět patří Vám / The World is Yours
Já věrnost ti přísahám / My Only Prayer
Symbol žen / Every Woman in the World
Ženská jako já / A Woman Like Me
Ženská jako Ty / A Woman Like You
Čekání / While He's Waiting
Chci Tě / I Want You Tonight
Tak kráčí ženská / Walk Like a Woman
Každý jsme sám / We All Dance Alone
Taková ženská / A Woman Like That
Viva Amor!
Nic nejde vzít zpět / No Turning Back

Act II  
Přijel cirkus / Ballyhoo
Patříš mně / You Belong to Me
Klíč / The Key
Cizinec - můj stín / The Man I Have Become
Kéž sílu mám / If I Could
Svatá Terezo / Saint Theresa
Blázen jak já / A Fool in Love
Čekání / While He's Waiting (reprise)
Přehlídka síly / Circus Tour de Force
Jde vo kejhák / Be Afraid
Finale
Kéž sílu mám / If I Could (reprise)

References

External links
The Official Czech production's website 
Carmen at Frank Wildhorn's official website

2008 musicals
Works based on Carmen (novella)
Musicals based on novels
Musicals by Frank Wildhorn